Sancé, Burkina Faso may refer to two towns:

 Sancé, Bam
 Sancé, Bazèga